The Lincolnshire Labour League or Amalgamated Labour League was a trade union representing agricultural labourers in Eastern England.

A large number of local unions of agricultural labourers were established in England early in 1872.  In Lincolnshire, this started with meetings held early in February in Barton-upon-Humber, Brattleby, Butterwick, Cammeringham, Frieston, Hibaldstow, Leverton, Long Bennington, North Carlton, Redbourne, Scampton and South Carlton. Typically, these meetings discussed a minimum wage and maximum hours for which the labourers were prepared to work.  Over the following months, several local unions were established: the Alford Labourers' Protection and Emigration Society, Bourn Agricultural Labourers' Society, Caistor Labourers' Protection Society, Louth and District Agricultural Labourers' Society, Lincoln Labour League, Long Sutton Nine Hours Labour League, Market Rasen Labourers' Protection and Emigration Society, and Swineshead Agricultural Labourers' Society.

In September, the main local unions in Lincolnshire met at the Spread Eagle in Grantham to establish a county union.  It was named the Lincolnshire Labour Emigration League, with William Banks as secretary, and offices on Witham Street in Boston.  George Allen was elected as treasurer, replaced later in the decade by Edward Bradbury, and then by William Taylor.  Meanwhile, a National Agricultural Labourers' Union (NALU) was established, based in Warwickshire, attracting many members in surrounding counties, but relatively few from Lincolnshire.  NALU differed by holding almost all its funds centrally, while the Labour League allowed each branch to control most of the funds it raised.

In September 1873, a meeting was held in Nottingham, with the aim of merging the Labour League with NALU, but NALU would not consider any changes to its system of government, and negotiations broke down.  The Labour League instead joined with a number of other county unions in the Federal Union of Labourers, a much looser organisation.  The Labour League began building up branches in Norfolk and Suffolk, and by 1874 had reached a peak membership of about 15,500, spread over 25 districts.

The union initially won wage increases, but by 1874 farmers were ready to work together to defeat the union.  A lock out of unionised labourers led to defeat for the workers, and wages were reduced.  Some members emigrated, while others left the defeated organisation.  Membership began falling, dropping to 5,500 by 1877.  It nearly collapsed in 1880, but relocated its office to its strongest remaining area of Eye, Suffolk, and had about 200 members throughout the decade.

Membership of the union fell again in the 1890s, and in 1896, when it had only 38 members, it decided to dissolve.

Districts

References

Agricultural organisations based in the United Kingdom
Agriculture and forestry trade unions
Defunct trade unions of the United Kingdom
Trade unions based in Lincolnshire
Trade unions established in 1872
Trade unions disestablished in the 1890s